The Icaro Relax is an Italian high-wing, single-place, hang glider, designed and produced by Icaro 2000.

Design and development
The Relax was introduced in 2003 as a beginner and flight training wing and also for recreational pilots looking for a wing that was easy rig and non-demanding to fly. The original Relax model was replaced in production by the improved RX2, or RelaX2. The RX2 comes in three sizes, "S", "M" and "L", with an "XL" version under development.

The aircraft is made from 7075 aluminum tubing, with the single-surface wing covered in Dacron sailcloth. The RX2 has an optional vertical tail fin that improves stability and prevents Dutch roll when the glider is being towed.

Variants
Relax 16
Original model introduced in 2003 and replaced in production by the RX2 M. It is a medium sized model for mid-weight pilots. Its  span wing is cable braced from a single kingpost. Certified as DHV Class 1-2.
RX2 S
A small-sized model for lightweight pilots. Its  span wing is cable braced from a single kingpost. Certified as DHV Class 1.
RX2 M
A medium sized model for mid-weight pilots that replaced the Relax 16 in production. Its  span wing is cable braced from a single kingpost. Certified as DHV Class 1.
RX2 L
A large-sized model for heavier pilots. Its  span wing is cable braced from a single kingpost. Certified as DHV Class 1.

Applications
Icaro Pit-Trike
Sunair Magic

Specifications (RX2 M)

References

External links

Relax
Hang gliders